Pantokratoros Monastery or the Monastery of the Pantocrator, also called the Monastery of the Ascension of the Lord, is a former Eastern Orthodox monastery that is part of the Meteora monastery complex in Thessaly, central Greece. It is located on the eastern side of Dupiani Rock. Only ruins remain today. The wall and foundation ruins are located in a crevice in the rock. The ruins of a tower can also be seen today.

Access
The monastery ruins can only be reached by rock climbing. Views of the monastery ruins can be seen from various sites throughout Meteora, including the Monastery of St. Nicholas Anapausas.

References

Meteora